Chitkala Biradar is an Indian stage artist and actress who predominantly works in Kannada language movies and serials. She is best known for her performance in the serial Kannadathi as Rathnamala.

Career
She is an English graduate from Gulbarga University. She worked as an English teacher. Later she also worked as an English teacher in Germany also. Due to pressure from actress Sundarashree she came into the Kannada industry from the teleserial Bande Baratava Kala.

Filmography

Television

References 

Year of birth missing (living people)
Living people
Kannada actresses
Actresses in Kannada cinema
Actresses in Kannada television